Shirega is a rural locality (a settlement) in Ramenskoye Rural Settlement, Syamzhensky District, Vologda Oblast, Russia. The population was 155 as of 2002.

Geography 
Shirega is located 23 km northeast of Syamzha (the district's administrative centre) by road.

References 

Rural localities in Syamzhensky District